Caspar Wistar may refer to:

 Caspar Wistar (glassmaker) (1696–1752), Pennsylvania glassmaker and landowner
 Caspar Wistar (physician) (1761–1818), physician and anatomist, grandson of the glassmaker